José Xavier Costa, or simply Xavier (born March 17, 1980, was a Brazilian left back. He last played for Gama.

Honours
Pernambuco State League: 1998, 1999, 2000
Nordeste Cup: 2000
Rio de Janeiro's Cup: 2007

Contract
8 May 2007 to 30 November 2007

External links

1980 births
Living people
Brazilian footballers
Sport Club do Recife players
Centro Sportivo Alagoano players
Guarani FC players
Santa Cruz Futebol Clube players
Sociedade Esportiva Palmeiras players
Figueirense FC players
Esporte Clube Vitória players
Botafogo de Futebol e Regatas players
Sociedade Esportiva do Gama players
Association football defenders